Subtile was a 24-gun corvette of the French Navy

Career
From 1777 to 1778, she was under Lieutenant Bidé de Maurville.

During the War of American Independence, Subtile served in the Indian Ocean in a squadron under Rear-Admiral Thomas d'Estienne d'Orves.  Lieutenant Périer de Salvert was in command from 13 September 1780 to 1 November.

On 9 February 1782, Estienne d'Orves died and Suffren assumed command of the squadron. He re-appointed his captains and gave Tromelin de La Nuguy command of Subtile.

She took part in the Battle of Negapatam under Huon de Kermadec on 6 July 1782. 

In the year 1787, she sailed for a cruise to China with Résolution (under Bruni d'Entrecasteaux), arriving on 7 February 1787, two days after Lapérouse had left. 

In November 1788, she was decommissioned in Toulon and became a hulk in 1789.

Notes, citations, and references 
Notes

Citations

References
 
 

Corvettes of the French Navy